The Fort Gaines Formation is a geologic formation in Alabama. It preserves fossils dating back to the Paleogene period.

See also

 List of fossiliferous stratigraphic units in Alabama
 Paleontology in Alabama

References
 

Paleogene Alabama